Elizabeth Christie may refer to:

 Elizabeth Christie (bowls), Scottish international lawn and indoor bowler
 Bessie Christie, full name Elizabeth Froomes Christie, (1904–1983), New Zealand artist